The Big River, an inland perennial river of the Goulburn Broken catchment, part of the Murray-Darling basin, is located in the lower South Eastern Highlands bioregion and Northern Country/North Central regions of the Australian state of Victoria. The headwaters of the Big River rise on the northern slopes of the Yarra Ranges and descend to flow into the Goulburn River within Lake Eildon.

Location and features
Formed by the confluence of the Springs and Oaks Creeks, the Big River rises in remote state forestry country on the northern slopes of the Yarra Ranges, part of the Great Dividing Range. The river flows generally north, through rugged national park and state forests as the river descends, joined by thirteen tributaries including the Torbreck River and the Taponga River, before reaching its confluence with the Goulburn River within the impounded Lake Eildon, located in the Lake Eildon National Park. The river descends  over its  course.

See also

References

Goulburn Broken catchment
Rivers of Greater Melbourne (region)
Rivers of Hume (region)
Tributaries of the Goulburn River